Shenango River Lake is a reservoir in the Shenango River Valley of western Pennsylvania and northeastern Ohio. Authorized by the Flood Control Acts of 1938, the lake is one of 16 flood control projects in the Pittsburgh District designed to prevent flooding. It is a popular site among anglers and is lined by 330 campsites.

The concrete Shenango Dam (National ID # PA00111) was completed in 1965, at a height of 68 feet and a length of 720 feet at its crest, as a flood control project of the United States Army Corps of Engineers.  The reservoir has a maximum capacity of 351,000 acre-feet, and a normal capacity of 29,920 acre-feet.

References

Reservoirs in Ohio
Reservoirs in Pennsylvania
Protected areas of Trumbull County, Ohio
Protected areas of Mercer County, Pennsylvania
Bodies of water of Mercer County, Pennsylvania
Rivers of Trumbull County, Ohio
1965 establishments in Ohio
1965 establishments in Pennsylvania